Estadio Municipal de Altamira (Basque: Altamira estadioa) is a sports stadium used for track and field, association football and rugby union, in Ordizia (Gipuzkoa). It is located in the district of Altamira.

Facilities
Built in 1972 and renovated in 2007, its playing surface is artificial grass and the covered grandstand has 430 seats. The athletics track is homologated for every official competition.

Main tenants
The stadium is used for the home matches of Ordizia RE since its foundation in 1973, although after playing in other nearby cities such as Hernani, Lazkao and Zarautz, and then at Estadio Fernando Trevijano since 1979, Ordizia returned to Altamira during its promotion to División de Honor de Rugby in 2009. The field is also used as home stadium by Ordizia KE in the football regional league.

References

External links
 Ordizia KE sports facilities
 Ordizia RE sports facilities

Athletics (track and field) venues in Spain
Rugby union stadiums in Spain
Football venues in the Basque Country (autonomous community)
Buildings and structures in Gipuzkoa